Johannes Zwick (c. 1496, in Konstanz – 23 October 1542, in Bischofszell) was a German Reformer and hymnwriter. He briefly hosted the Anabaptist Johannes Bünderlin in 1529. He died of the plague.

References

1542 deaths
German Protestant hymnwriters
Year of birth uncertain
16th-century deaths from plague (disease)
16th-century German writers
16th-century German male writers
People from Konstanz
1490s births
16th-century German jurists